Self ignition can refer to:

 spontaneous combustion or
 the ability of diesel fuel to ignite under high compression in diesel engines.

See also 
 Self-ignition temperature